Chelsea and Fulham is a constituency represented in the House of Commons of the UK Parliament since its 2010 creation. It is currently represented by Greg Hands of the Conservative Party. He was the MP for the former neighbouring constituency of Hammersmith and Fulham from 2005 to 2010 before it was abolished. He is currently the Chairman of the Conservative Party.

Boundaries

Chelsea and Fulham constituency is made up of the following electoral wards:

From the London Borough of Hammersmith and Fulham: Fulham Broadway; Munster; Palace Riverside; Parsons Green and Walham; Sands End; Town.
From the Royal Borough of Kensington and Chelsea: Brompton and Hans Town; Chelsea Riverside; Redcliffe; Royal Hospital; Stanley.

2010 boundary change
Following the review of parliamentary representation in London, the boroughs of Kensington and Chelsea and Hammersmith and Fulham were paired for constituency allocation purposes and allocated three seats between them.

This broke the previous pairings of Kensington and Chelsea with the City of Westminster, and of Hammersmith and Fulham with the London Borough of Ealing, and therefore abolished the mainstay but not comprehensive seats Hammersmith and Fulham and Kensington and Chelsea with their "spillover" cross-boundary seats of Regents Park and Kensington North and Ealing Acton and Shepherds Bush.

The historical constituency of Kensington was recreated, and the Hammersmith seat was also revived.

Political history
The constituency includes affluent areas and opulent private housing. The small amount of social housing in the constituency is concentrated in the smaller than ward-size Worlds End Estate. This is the safest urban Conservative seat in the country based on length of tenure and size of majorities.  An alternative in-depth analysis, of local elections, confirms one ward has seen opposition members in elections since the 1980s, of 11 wards forming the seat. At the 2010 election, only five other constituencies voted more strongly for the Conservative Party: Richmond (Yorkshire), Beaconsfield in Buckinghamshire, Windsor (Berkshire), Hampshire North East and Chesham and Amersham also in Buckinghamshire.

Somewhat surprisingly, however, in the 2017 United Kingdom general election the Conservative majority in Chelsea and Fulham was almost halved from 16,022 to 8,188, making it only the eighth-safest Conservative seat in Greater London (with several other seats such as Romford and Bexleyheath and Crayford proving safer for the Tories despite previously electing Labour MPs in the Blair era, whilst Chelsea never did).

In the early 1960s the Chelsea Labour Party (old boundaries) created the National Campaign for the Young Chronic Sick, led by constituency member (Mr) Marsh Dickson, which generated national TV and newspaper coverage leading to the Chronically Sick and Disabled Persons Act 1970 promoted as a Private Members Bill by Alf Morris MP.

Proposed boundary expansion
To return to a reduced the number of MPs (600 nationally) it was proposed that the Chelsea and Fulham constituency would be abolished and merged into two constituencies of Hammersmith & Fulham, a notional Labour seat, and Kensington & Chelsea, a notional Conservative seat.

Constituency profile
The football grounds at Stamford Bridge and Craven Cottage are in the seat, which is the chosen home of many of London's elite footballers, as well as other wealthy celebrities. The constituency includes the fashionable King's Road thoroughfare, a key destination for shopping and culture.

Members of Parliament

Elections
For results of predecessor seats, see Kensington and Chelsea, and Hammersmith and Fulham.

Elections in the 2010s

* Served as an MP in the 2005–2010 Parliament

The new seat of Chelsea and Fulham was fought for the first time at the 2010 general election, when it had a notional Conservative majority of over 10,000 based on 2005 election results.

See also
 List of parliamentary constituencies in London

References

External links 
nomis Constituency Profile for Chelsea and Fulham — presenting data from the ONS annual population survey and other official statistics.
Politics Resources (Election results from 1922 onwards)
Electoral Calculus (Election results from 1955 onwards)

Politics of the Royal Borough of Kensington and Chelsea
Parliamentary constituencies in London
Chelsea and Fulham
Fulham
Chelsea, London